Chris J. Vlasto (born October 27, 1966) is Senior Executive Producer of Investigations at ABC-TV News. He is also Co-host of "The Investigation" podcast. He was executive producer of Good Morning America. Prior to that, he was a senior producer at ABC News 20/20 and senior producer of the Law and Justice unit.  Before that he was a senior Broadcast Producer of Good Morning America where he won three Emmy Awards for Outstanding Morning Program.  He is the son of James Vlasto, former Press Secretary to the New York Governor Hugh Carey and his half brother, Josh Vlasto is currently the Deputy Communications Director to Governor Andrew Cuomo.

Early life

Chris Vlasto was born in Manhattan, New York. He graduated from Choate Rosemary Hall in 1984. He received his undergraduate degree from University of Southern California in 1988. He resides in Rye, New York with his wife, Deirdre Michalopoulos, and their two sons: Nicholas and Alexander.  Vlasto is the grandson of the late Solon G. Vlasto, publisher of the Atlantis, once the most successful Greek-language daily newspaper published in the United States. Atlantis was founded by Solon G. Vlasto's uncle, Solon J. Vlasto in 1894.  Solon J. Vlasto was also the founder and president of the first Greek Orthodox Church, The Holy Trinity, in New York City in 1892.

Career

On January 21, 1998, Vlasto produced the reports by correspondent Jackie Judd which first broadcast the allegations about President Clinton's association with former White House intern Monica Lewinsky. Vlasto also produced the Diane Sawyer interview with Ken Starr and the Barbara Walters interview with Monica Lewinsky which was one of the most watched news interviews in television history.

Vlasto also covered the September 11, 2001 attacks on the World Trade Center, the Florida Recount, the Lewinsky scandal, Oklahoma City bombing, and the OJ Simpson Trial.

Jim McDougal, the real estate speculator whose mismanagement of the Whitewater land deal with his partners Bill Clinton and Hillary Clinton led to the Whitewater controversy of the 1990s, says of Vlasto in the book Arkansas Mischief by Boston Globe writer, Curtis Wilkie:
"Though Chris had the lean and hungry look of a young journalist, his manner was that of a scholar.  I discovered that the man belonging to the gentle voice on the phone had the cunning of a con artist but the soul of a true friend"

In 2002, Details Magazine named Vlasto one of the 50 most powerful people in the United States under 37.  Diane Sawyer said, "He is of the tradition of journalists you don't see any more. He has got a craggy integrity."

Recently, Vlasto produced the first interview with one of the women Anthony Weiner was sexting with, Meagan Broussard, together with ABC News 20/20 anchor Chris Cuomo.

Awards
Vlasto has won more than a dozen awards including the Edward R. Murrow Award and the Joan Barone Award for his coverage of President Clinton.
 
He also won an Emmy Award and a Sigma Delta Chi Award for his coverage of the 9/11 terror attacks.

He was a 2003 Gerald Loeb Award winner for Television Short Form business journalism.

Good Morning America 

Emmy Awards
 Outstanding Morning Program, "Good Morning America," Executive Broadcast Producer, June 23, 2014.
 Excellence in Morning Programming Good Morning America, June 14, 2007.
 Outstanding Morning Program Good Morning America, Chris Vlasto, Senior Broadcast Producer, August 30, 2009.
 Outstanding Morning Program Good Morning America, Chris Vlasto, Senior Broadcast Producer, June 13, 2008.

References

External links
Profile of Chris Vlasto: UCLA Anderson School of Management 
Chris Cuomo's Webpage

American people of Greek descent
Emmy Award winners
Living people
ABC News
Choate Rosemary Hall alumni
1966 births
Gerald Loeb Award winners for Television